The German torpedo boat T12 was the last of a dozen Type 35 torpedo boats built for the Kriegsmarine (German Navy) during the late 1930s. Completed in mid-1940, the boat was transferred to Norway where she escorted minelayers as they laid minefields in the North Sea. She was one of the escorts for several commerce raiders passing through the English Channel in 1941 and helped to escort a pair of battleships and a heavy cruiser through the Channel back to Germany in the Channel Dash in early 1942. T12 was assigned to the Torpedo School in late 1943 and was then transferred to the Baltic Sea in mid-1944 where she escorted heavy cruisers as they bombarded Soviet positions. The boat was allocated to the Soviet Union after the war and renamed Podvizhny ("Agile"), serving with the Baltic Fleet until she was seriously damaged in a boiler explosion. Renamed Kit ("Whale") in 1954 for use as a vessel in simulated nuclear testing on Lake Ladoga, the boat was scuttled in 1959.

Design and description
The Type 35 was an unsuccessful attempt by the Kriegsmarine to design a fast, ocean-going torpedo boat that did not exceed the  displacement limit of the London Naval Treaty for ships that counted against the national tonnage limit. Their crew numbered 119 officers and sailors.

As built, the Type 35 class mounted a single  SK C/32 gun on the stern. Anti-aircraft defense was provided by a single  SK C/30 anti-aircraft gun superfiring over the 10.5 cm gun and a pair of  C/30 guns on the bridge wings. They carried six above-water  torpedo tubes in two triple mounts and could also carry 30 mines (or 60 if the weather was good). Many boats exchanged the 3.7 cm gun for another 2 cm gun, depth charges and minesweeping paravanes before completion. Late-war additions were limited to the installation of radar, radar detectors and additional AA guns, usually at the expense of the aft torpedo tube mount.

Construction and career
T12 was ordered on 29 June 1936 from DeSchiMAG, laid down at their Bremen shipyard on 20 August 1938 as yard number 939, launched on 12 April 1939 and commissioned on 3 July 1940. The boat was working up until September when she was transferred to Norway. T12 and the torpedo boat  escorted a minelaying mission from Stavanger on the night of 26/27 January 1941 and then another one the following night. The boat was refitted in Wesermünde from March to September. The torpedo boats arrived on the 25th and Komet reached Cherbourg the following day. The ships departed that night and arrived at Le Havre the following morning, where they waited for night to fall before proceeding. The British had spotted them and they were intercepted by motor torpedo boats (MTB) on the 28th between Boulogne and Dunkirk. In a very confused night action, T12 accidentally hit T4 several times, injuring several men, but they were successful in passing Komet through the Channel and into the Atlantic. On 2 December T12 and T2 rendezvoused with the commerce raider Thor in the Schillig Roads; after they were joined by T4, T7 and the torpedo boat  the following day, they began to escort Thor through the Channel. Delayed by heavy fog, the ships did not reach Brest, France, until the 15th, while Thor continued onwards into the Atlantic. T12 and T7 sailed for Germany on 17 December, where the former was to begin a brief refit at Kiel.

After arriving in Germany, T12 and T5 were transferred to Norway for escort duties. On 6 March they briefly screened the battleship  as she searched for the Russia-bound Convoy PQ 12. She began a refit upon her arrival that lasted until August. On 15–19 August T12 was one of the escorts, together with T9 and the destroyer , for the minelayer  from Kiel to Narvik, Norway.

T12 was assigned to the 2nd Torpedo Boat Flotilla in France in October. T12 received a refit in Kiel in May–August and was then assigned to the Torpedo School from December through mid-1944. Rejoining the 2nd Flotilla, now consisting of T12, her sisters , T5, and the torpedo boats T13 and T16, the flotilla screened the heavy cruiser  as she shelled Soviet positions during the evacuation of Sworbe, on the island of Ösel, on the night of 23/24 November. Two months later, T12 was one of the escorts for Prinz Eugen as the latter ship supported a German counterattack against advancing Soviet forces near Cranz, East Prussia, on 29–30 January 1945.

The boat was allocated to the Soviets when the Allies divided the surviving ships of the Kriegsmarine amongst themselves in late 1945, and was included on the Soviet Navy vessel list on 5 November, assigned to the Baltic Fleet. She was handed over to a Soviet crew in Germany on 27 December, who raised the naval jack of the Soviet Navy aboard her on New Year's Day 1946. She was renamed Podvizhny on 13 February 1946 before joining the North Baltic Fleet two days later. Podvizhny served with the fleet until 1949, when two crewmen were killed and the boat seriously damaged when the main steam pipe exploded during exercises. After failed repair attempts, she was withdrawn from service on 8 April 1953, disarmed, and handed over to the central directorate of the Soviet Navy as an unpowered experimental vessel, being renamed Kit on 30 December 1954. The boat was sunk in shallow water off the islands of Heinäsenmaa and Makarinsaari in northwestern Lake Ladoga after simulated nuclear testing in early 1959 and struck on 13 March of that year. In mid-1991, the radioactively contaminated wreck was raised by a team from the Leningrad Naval Base and towed to a different location, where it was scuttled.

Notes

References

External links
Type 35 on German Navy.de
Podvizhny photo gallery on navsource.narod.ru

Type 35 torpedo boats
1939 ships